Prince Eunsin (11 January 1755 – 29 March 1771), personal name Yi Jin, was a Korean prince, as the fourth son of Crown Prince Sado, and his concubine, Royal Noble Consort Suk of the Buan Im clan.

He later become the heir of Prince Yeollyeong, the younger half-brother of King Gyeongjong and King Yeongjo.

Life 
Prince Eunsin was the second illegitimate son of Crown Prince Sado, born to Royal Noble Consort Suk of the Buan Im clan. He was the younger brother of Prince Euneon and half-brother of Crown Prince Uiso, Jeongjo of Joseon and Prince Eunjeon.

In 1762, when his father was executed by King Yeongjo for treason, he was left unprotected and in poverty. He and his brother, Prince Euneon, had to borrow money from merchants and from Hong Bong-han, the father of Crown Prince Sado's primary wife, and over time, the two accumulated a substantial debt.

In 1769, Prince Eunsin married Lady Hong of Namyang (1755 – 1829), daughter of an official named Hong Dae-hyeon. They had no issue.

On February 2, 1771, King Yeongjo sent him to exile in Daejeong, on Jeju Island. Less than two months later, on March 29, he became sick from an epidemic and died, at the age of 16.

Aftermath 
In 1776, according to the will of King Yeongjo, King Jeongjo, the prince's older brother, posthumously appointed him to be the heir to Prince Yeollyeong, who was his great-uncle. Whereas being the successor of Prince Yeollyeong, Prince Eunsin was not regarded as the adopted son of Prince Nakcheon, who used to be the heir to Prince Yeollyeong, but he was deprived of the status during the reign of Jeongjo.

On December 12, 1779, he was given the posthumous name "Somin"; it was changed to "Chungheon" on February 28, 1871.

In 1815, during the reign of King Sunjo, Yi Chae-jung (이채중), a fifth-great-grandson of King Injo, was appointed to be Prince Eunsin's adopted son. He was given a new name, Yi Gu, and received the title Prince Namyeon (1788-1836).

Prince Namyeon was, through his fourth son, Heungseon Daewongun, the biological grandfather of Emperor Gojong of Korea.

Family
Father: 
Crown Prince Sado (13 February 1735 - 12 July 1762) (조선 장조)
Grandfather:
 Biological: Yeongjo of Joseon (31 October 1694 - 22 April 1776) (조선 영조)
 Adoptive: Yi Hwon, Prince Yeollyeong (13 June 1699 - 2 October 1719) (이훤 연령군)
 Grandmother:
 Biological: Royal Noble Consort Yeong of the Jeonui Yi clan (15 August 1696 - 23 August 1764) (영빈 이씨)
 Adoptive: Princess Consort Sangsan of the Sangsan Kim clan (26 June 1698 - 12 June 1725) (상산군부인 상산 김씨)
Mother:
Biological: Royal Noble Consort Suk of the Buan Im clan (? - 1773) (숙빈 임씨)
Grandfather: Im Ji-beon (임지번)
Grandmother: Lady Kim of the Gimhae Kim clan (부인 김해 김씨)
Legal: Queen Heongyeong of the Pungsan Hong clan (6 August 1735 - 13 January 1816) (헌경왕후 홍씨)

Consort and issue
 Lady Hong of the Namyang Hong clan (1755 - 21 March 1829) (남양군부인 남양 홍씨) – No issue.

See also 
 Prince Euneon
 Crown Prince Sado
 Crown Prince Uiso
 Crown Prince Hyojang
 Prince Nakcheon
 Heungseon Daewongun

References

18th-century Korean people
1755 births
1771 deaths
House of Yi
Korean princes